California's 26th district may refer to:

 California's 26th congressional district
 California's 26th State Assembly district
 California's 26th State Senate district